Kindred Hospital - San Francisco Bay Area is a 99-bed long-term acute care facility in San Leandro, California, US. The hospital is operated by Kindred Healthcare based in Louisville, Kentucky.

History
The hospital that currently operates as Kindred Hospital- San Francisco Bay Area was founded in the early 1960s as San Leandro Memorial Hospital.  In 1966, the hospital was purchased by a non-profit Christian based organization, the Vesper Society, and began operating as Vesper Memorial Hospital

The Vesper Society continued to operate Vesper Memorial as a general acute care facility until 1984, when the hospital, along with sister facility, Vesper Society Hospital in nearby Hayward, was sold to Texas-based for profit Republic Health Corporation in a $40 million transaction.

In the mid-1990s, Vencor, Inc purchased the facility and converted it from a general acute care hospital to a long-term acute care facility. In 2001, Vencor, Inc. changed its name to Kindred Healthcare and continues to operate the facility today.

References

External links
 Official website

Hospitals in Alameda County, California
Buildings and structures in San Leandro, California